Mount Roy  is a mountain rising to  on the south side of Benighted Pass, Barker Range, Victoria Land, Antarctica. Mapped by United States Geological Survey (USGS) from surveys and U.S. Navy air photos, 1960–64. Named by Advisory Committee on Antarctic Names (US-ACAN) after Robert R. Roy, cook at Hallett Station in 1957.

References 

Mountains of Victoria Land
Pennell Coast